The Netherlands national under-17 football team represents the Netherlands in international football at this age level and is controlled by the Koninklijke Nederlandse Voetbalbond — KNVB, the governing body for football in the Netherlands. They are coached by Mischa Visser.

Competitive record

FIFA U-16/17 World Cup record

UEFA European Under-17 Championship record

*Draws include knockout matches decided on penalty kicks.
**Gold background colour indicates that the tournament was won.
***Red border colour indicates tournament was held on home soil.

Honours
FIFA U-17 World Cup
 Third place: 2005

UEFA European Under-17 Championship
 First place: 2011, 2012, 2018, 2019
 Second place: 2005, 2009, 2014, 2022 
 Third place: 2000

Current squad
 The following players were selected for the 2022 UEFA European Under-17 Championship matches between 16 May and 1 June 2022.

References

Notes

See also
 Netherlands (senior) team
 Netherlands national under-21 football team
 Netherlands national under-19 football team
 Netherlands women's national football team

European national under-17 association football teams
Football
Youth football in the Netherlands